The Nio ET5 is a battery-powered compact executive sedan produced by Chinese electric car company Nio.

Overview

The Nio ET5 was unveiled in China on 18 December 2021 at the 'Nio Day' event in Suzhou's Olympic Sports Centre. It was on sale in September 2022 with a starting price of ¥328.000 (~$46,100 USD) and acts as a direct competitor to Tesla’s Model 3 sedan and the Xpeng P7.

The ET5’s exterior design is said to evoke Nio’s EP9 supercar DNA and be ready for "Autonomous Driving”. The car has a rear ducktail spoiler, front air curtain, flush doorhandles, soft close doors and frameless windows to improve aerodynamic efficiency. The car has a 1.28m2 panoramic roof, said to protect up to 99.9% of UV rays from the sun.

The interior of the ET5 features a panoramic digital cockpit with AR and VR technology. ET5's interior was inspired by trends in furniture, fashion, and footwear. It features new colours such Terracotta, a deep and fiery orange. ET5 features a range of recycled and more sustainable materials such as  Clean+ sustainable fabric. Like the Nio ET7, ET5 has  invisible air vents and 256 colour ambient lights. A Dolby Atmos 7.1.4 surround sound system, standard on the car.

Specifications
The Nio ET5 comes available with three battery options: 

A 75 kWh battery with  NEDC range,  WLTP range.

A 100 kWh battery with  NEDC range,  WLTP range.

The ET5 will be compatible with Nio's Power Swap Stations that are now in China and Norway.

References

External links

 Official website

ET5
2020s cars
Cars of China
Production electric cars
Cars introduced in 2021
Sports sedans